Wolfgang Cerny (born August 31, 1984 in Vienna) is an Austrian actor and producer, best known for his roles in Storm of Love (2009-2010), Sobibor (2018) and The Red Ghost (2021). From 2012 until 2022 he was actively working in Moscow, Russia.

Life and career
Wolfgang grew up in a family of sportsmen. During his matura studies at a sport-gymnasium, Cerny played in various school and student groups in Vienna. He was also heavily involved in sports, which included martial arts, boxing, horse riding, alpine skiing, surfing, swimming. He is a certified ski-instructor. Originally he wanted become a doctor, and enrolled into medical university. His father is a dentist and brother, Michael, a plastic surgeon. But soon Wolfgang decided that the medical profession is not for him. Wolfgang instead went to Los Angeles and studied at the American Academy of Dramatic Arts for a year. Afterwards, he returned to Austria, because he did not wish to live in America. Later he also participated in acting projects at the Vienna Film Academy and the University of Applied Arts Vienna. Cerny also appeared in several short films, and the short film We are all naked underneath (2006, directed by Alexander Dirninger) was shown at various film festivals in Vienna, Hamburg, Brest and Tokyo.

In May 2008 Cerny played in the Vienna Off-Theater in the play Taifun by Menyhért Lengyel, directed by Daniel Schrader. He also played in Vienna at the Theater in the Drachengasse.

In 2009 Cerny completed his acting training at the Music and Arts University of the City of Vienna. From February 2009 Cerny played at the Volkstheater Wien in a stage version of The Graduate. His theatrical repertoire includes roles such as Jimmy in Look Back in Anger by John Osborne, Mark Anton in Julius Caesar by William Shakespeare, Ferdinand in Intrigue and Love by Friedrich Schiller and others.

From August 2009 until August 2010 Cerny played Lukas Zastrow in the popular German telenovela Storm of Love which was a breakthrough role for him. From October 2009 to August 2010 he was the male lead actor of the 5th season together with on-screen partner Sarah Stork.

In 2010/2011 Cerny was a member of the ensemble at the Munich Schauburg and played in both classic and modern pieces by William Shakespeare and Blake Nelson. In 2011 Cerny played there the role of Prince Ferdinand in Shakespeare's late work The Tempest.

In the summer of 2012, Wolfgang Cerny took on the lead role of Alexander von Foss, a German sniper, in the Russian mini-series Snipers alongside Tatyana Arntgolts, directed by Zinovy Roizman. Especially for the role, he learnt the Russian language, which led to him later becoming an in-demand actor in Russia. In an episode of the 11th season of the Austrian crime series SOKO Donau (2019), he played a blacksmith and member of a medieval troupe.

In 2018 he played the sadistic staff sergeant Gustav Wagner in the Russian WWII drama Sobibor, based on real events.

In 2020 Cerny took part in the Russian ice-dancing television show Ice Age together with Olympic champion Oksana Domnina.

In 2021 Wolfgang Cerny played in The Red Ghost, a Russian WWII thriller film by Andrei Bogatyryov.

After the 2022 Russian invasion of Ukraine, Cerny together with his family left Russia for Austria.

Personal life
Wolfgang has been in a relationship with Victoria Slobodyan, a Russian citizen, starting from 2016. They married in 2019, and in 2021 Victoria gave birth to their son.

Filmography

Films

References

External links
 Official Website
 

1984 births
Living people
21st-century Austrian male actors
Austrian male film actors
Austrian male television actors
Austrian people of Czech descent
Male actors from Vienna
Method actors
University of Music and Performing Arts Vienna alumni
Austrian expatriates in Russia